The Poole Local Group is a political grouping on the Bournemouth, Christchurch and Poole Council.

History 
The group was formed in June 2022 by five councillors. Four out of the five members were deselected by the Poole Conservative Association for the 2023 election. With the founding of the group, the council once again became a hung council with no overall control, the Conservatives being put into a minority administration.

Membership 
The group has 4 members:

References 

Politics of Poole
Locally based political parties in England
Political parties established in 2022
2022 establishments in England
Conservative Party (UK) breakaway groups